State Route 49 (SR 49) is a north–south state highway in the U.S. state of California that passes through many historic mining communities of the 1849 California gold rush and it is known as the Golden Chain Highway. The highway's creation was lobbied by the Mother Lode Highway Association, a group of locals and historians seeking a single highway connect many relevant locations along the Gold Rush to honor the 49ers. One of the bridges along SR 49 is named for the leader of the association, Archie Stevenot.

The roadway begins at Oakhurst, Madera County, in the Sierra Nevada, where it diverges from State Route 41. It continues in a generally northwest direction, weaving through the communities of Goldside and Ahwahnee, before crossing into Mariposa County. State Route 49 then continues northward through the counties of Tuolumne, Calaveras, Amador, El Dorado, Placer, Nevada, Yuba, Sierra, and Plumas, where it reaches its northern terminus at State Route 70, in Vinton.

Route description

SR 49 starts at an intersection with SR 41 near Oakhurst. The road heads west before turning north before the town of Ahwahnee near the Wassama Roundhouse State Historic Park. SR 49 continues north, passing through Nipinnswassee before entering Mariposa County and the Sierra National Forest. Continuing to the west, SR 49 passes through Mormon Bar before running concurrently with SR 140 briefly through the town of Mariposa. Near the town of Mount Bullion, SR 49 passes by Mariposa-Yosemite Airport before turning northwest and going through Bear Valley and the intersection with CR J16. The highway passes by the southern edge of Lake McClure and intersects SR 132 in Coulterville before passing into Tuolumne County.

SR 49 continues north through the town of Moccasin, where SR 120 runs concurrently for several miles to the town of Chinese Camp. SR 49 then turns northeast and runs concurrently with SR 108, intersecting CR E5, into the city of Sonora. SR 49 splits from SR 108 and enters downtown Sonora as Stockton Street, turning north onto Washington Street before leaving the Sonora city limits. SR 49 intersects the north end of CR E5 before passing through Tuttletown and crossing into Calaveras County at the bridge over the Stanislaus River.

SR 49 then enters Carson Hill. Passing by New Melones Lake, SR 49 briefly runs concurrently with SR 4 in the city of Angels Camp.

SR 49 continues through Altaville. The highway continues into San Andreas, where SR 12 terminates. SR 49 continues into Mokelumne Hill, where it intersects with SR 26.

SR 49 then passes through Big Bar and across the Mokelumne River, which is located on the county line between Amador County and Calaveras County. SR 49 then runs concurrently with SR 88 briefly through the town of Martell before intersecting the eastern terminus of SR 104. SR 49 then runs west of Sutter Creek and Amador City, via a bypass around those two cities that was constructed in 2009,) before reaching Drytown.

SR 49 then intersects the eastern end of SR 16 before passing through the city of Plymouth. The highway continues through Enterprise before crossing into El Dorado County and passing through the towns of Nashville, El Dorado, and Diamond Springs (the latter two as Pleasant Valley Road) before entering Placerville. SR 49 traverses downtown on Pacific Street and Main Street before continuing onto Spring Street, where it intersects the US 50 expressway at-grade before continuing north as Georgetown Road.

As it leaves the Placerville city limits, SR 49 intersects the southern terminus of SR 193 before continuing northwest as Coloma Road into the town of Coloma. In Coloma, the highway intersects with SR 153, a spur route to the Marshall Gold Discovery State Historic Park. SR 49 then continues through Lotus before turning north at Pilot Hill and intersecting the northern terminus of SR 193 at Cool. SR 49 continues through the Auburn State Recreation Area before crossing into Placer County and entering the city of Auburn as High Street for a very short distance before turning west on Elm Avenue. SR 49 continues onto I-80 west at an interchange for a very short distance until the interchange at exit 119B where SR 49 departs from I-80. SR 49 then continues almost due north out of the Auburn city limits.

SR 49 continues north, crossing into Nevada County and passing through Higgins Corner and Forest Springs. SR 49 becomes a freeway and enters the city of Grass Valley, where it then runs concurrently with SR 20 and interchanges with the northern end of SR 174. The SR 49/SR 20 concurrency continues as a freeway into Nevada City. SR 49 then splits from SR 20 at an at-grade intersection just after the freeway ends heads west out of Nevada City.

SR 49 goes over the South Branch of the Yuba River near the Malakoff Diggins State Historic Park. SR 49 continues through the towns of Sweetland and North San Juan, where it crosses into Yuba County and enters Tahoe National Forest. The route goes through Log Cabin and Camptonville. SR 49 then crosses into Sierra County, where it passes through Goodyears Bar, Downieville, and Sierra City on its forest journey. After passing near Kentucky Mine Historic Park, SR 49 goes through Bassetts and Haskell Creek, then shares a wrong-way concurrency with SR 89 briefly through Sattley and Sierraville. SR 49 then leaves the forest as Loyalton Road, passing through the city of Loyalton and intersecting CR A24 before crossing into Plumas County as Vinton Loyalton Road, where SR 49 ends at SR 70 in the town of Vinton.

SR 49 is part of the California Freeway and Expressway System, and from SR 140 to a point north of SR 88 as well as from I-80 to SR 20 is part of the National Highway System, a network of highways that are considered essential to the country's economy, defense, and mobility by the Federal Highway Administration. SR 49 is eligible to be included in the State Scenic Highway System, and from the Sierra-Yuba county line to Yuba Summit is officially designated as a scenic highway by the California Department of Transportation. The segment of SR 49 from SR 20 in Nevada City to SR 89 in Sierraville also forms part of the Yuba-Donner Scenic Byway, a National Forest Scenic Byway.

SR 49 is known as the Golden Chain Highway for the entire route. SR 49 is known as the John C. Begovich Memorial Highway from Jackson to SR 88 (honoring the California legislator and U.S. Marshal), and the Mother Lode Highway from Sonora to Auburn.

Historical landmarks
The SR 49 corridor was designed to connect historical locations and landmarks of the California Gold Rush. These include:

Mariposa County
 Mormon Bar was first mined by veterans of the Mormon Battalion in 1849.
 Bear Valley, where John C. Frémont operated his Ride Tree and Josephine Mines between 1850 and 1860.
 Coulterville, where George W. Coulter settled in 1850 and established a tent store to supply miners.

Tuolumne County
 Jacksonville was the principal river town in 1850 for miners working along the Tuolumne River. The site has since been inundated by Don Pedro Reservoir.
 Chinese Camp was the headquarters for stagelines and for several California Chinese mining companies in the 1850s.
 The Wells Fargo Express Company Building in Chinese Camp was built in 1849 and was the home of a general merchandise store.
 Montezuma, a mining town that flourished after a ditch and flume were completed in 1852, bringing in water for placer mining. The town was nearly destroyed by an incendiary fire in 1866.
 Jamestown became known as gateway to the Mother Lode and the southern mines. Large quantities of gold were found from nearby Woods Creek.
 Tuttletown, named after judge A. A. H. Tuttle who settled there 1848, was an early-day stopping place.

Calaveras County
 Robinson's Ferry was established in 1848 to ferry passengers and freight across the Stanislaus River.
 The birthplace of Archie Stevenot, who helped found the California State Chamber of Commerce and was officially named "Mr. Mother Lode" by the California legislature in 1961.
 Carson Hill was one of the most productive mining areas in California. The largest gold nugget in the state was discovered here in 1854, weighing 195 pounds troy.
 Angels Camp was founded in 1849 and became one of the richest quartz mining sections of the Mother Lode.
 The Angels Hotel in Angels Camp was originally a canvas tent erected in 1851, replaced by a one-story wooden structure, and then rebuilt with stone in 1855.
 Altaville was the site of a foundry that was established in 1854. Most of the stamp mills and a large portion of the mining machinery erected in Calaveras and Tuolumne Counties were built at this foundry.
 The Prince-Garibaldi Building in Altaville was built in 1852, originally housing a general merchandise business.
 Fourth Crossing became notable in the 1850s for its rich placer ores. The town also served as an important stagecoach and freighting depot, particularly for the southern mines.
 San Andreas was originally established as a mining camp by Mexican gold miners in 1848. The gold uncovered from the town's underground river channels and placer mines contributed to the Union's success during the American Civil War.
 Chili Gulch was the richest placer mining section in Calaveras County.
 Mokelumne Hill was the richest placer mining section of Calaveras County and one of the principal mining towns of California.
 Big Bar, along the Mokelumne River, was mined in 1848.

Amador County
 The Butte Store, built in 1857, is the only structure still standing in Butte City.
 Both Argonaut Mine and adjacent Kennedy Mine were discovered in the 1850s and became the highest-yielding gold mines in the state.
 Sutter Creek became a boomtown after quartz gold was discovered in the area in 1851.
 Drytown, founded in 1848, is Amador County's oldest community, and the first in the county in which gold was discovered.

El Dorado County
 El Dorado, originally an important camp on the old Carson Trail, become the center of a mining district by 1849-50 and the crossroads for freight and stagecoach lines.
 Diamond Springs was among the most gold-rich locations in the region, with its most thriving period in 1851.
 Placerville, a gold rush town that also served as a relay station of the Central Overland Pony Express from 1860 to 1861.
 Marshall Gold Discovery State Historic Park, which marks the discovery of gold by James W. Marshall at Sutter's Mill in 1848. Marshall then traveled on Coloma Road to give news of the discovery to John Sutter.

Placer County
 Auburn developed into an important mining town, trading post, and stage terminal after gold was discovered nearby in 1848.

Nevada County
 The former Overland Emigrant Trail, which was used by travelers from points east to the California gold fields, crosses the present day SR 49 near Wolf Creek.
 Empire Mine was in constant operation from 1850 to the late 1950s.
 Gold Hill in Grass Valley was the site of one of the first discoveries of quartz gold in California.

Major intersections

See also

References

External links

WestCoast Roads- State Route 49
Caltrans: Route 49 highway conditions
California Highways: SR 49
History Highway 49
Weather on Highway 49 in Angels Camp, CA

049
049
049
State Route 049
State Route 049
State Route 049
State Route 049
State Route 049
State Route 049
State Route 049
State Route 049
State Route 049
State Route 049
State Route 049
Sierra Nevada (United States)
Gold rush trails and roads